Rome Independent Cinema Festival is an annual film festival held in August in the Rome, Italy. The festival is organized by HF Productions, and was first held in August 2018.

The festival 
Rome Independent Cinema Festival was first started in August 2018, and is held annually at the screening venue, Casa del Cinema located in the Villa Borghese in Rome. The event is organized by Copenhagen-based production company, HF Productions and aims to promote Italian independent cinema. In 2019, the event was co-sponsored by Devent VFX Studio and Fonderia delle Arti. 

At the 2nd event in 2019, filmmakers Toni D’Angelo, Mario Sesti, Christian Carmosino Mereu and Chanel Agura were the jury panelists for the festival.

Rome Independent Cinema Festival awards winners

2018
The following are the event winners of the 2018 Rome Independent Cinema Festival:
 Best Feature Film: Paradize 89 (2018), director Madara Dišlere
 Best Short Film: Mazeppa (2017), director Jonathan Lago Lago
 Best Comedy: Guardians
 Best Drama: A Touch of Spring
 Best Experimental: Dreaming in March
 Best Foreign Film: Anissa 2002 (2015), director Fabienne Facco
 Best Cinematography: The Legend of Ben Hall (2018), cinematographer Peter Szilveszter
 Best Editing: La Cumbre (2017), director Dana Romanoff
 Best Writing: The Night Witches by Steven Prowse
 Best Feature Documentary: The March of Hope (2018), director Jamie Croft
 Best Short Documentary: El Gallo (2018), director Michael Medoway
 Best Animated Short: Goodnight

2019
The following are the event winners of the 2019 Rome Independent Cinema Festival:
 Best Feature Film: Olma Djon (2018), director Victoria Yakubov
 Best Short Film: Strange Cities Are Familiar (2018), director Saeed Taji Farouky
 Best Comedy: Only Good Things 
 Best Drama: A Thousand Miles Behind (2018), director Nathan Wetherington
 Best Experimental: Ansage Ende (2019), director Stijn Verhoeff
 Best Foreign Film: Fever
 Best Cinematography: Chronos
 Best Editing: The Houses We Were (2018), director Arianna Lodeserto
 Best Writing: (Dis)Honoured
 Best Feature Documentary: The Dream of Homer (2018), director Emiliano Aiello
 Best Short Documentary: Playground Addiction (2019), directors Carlo Furgeri Gilbert, Marzio Mirabella, and Niccolò Rastrelli
 Best Animated: Lemons – Deseisaocho la banda (2018), Daniela Godel
 Best Italian Film: Where is Europe
 Special Mention for Best Comedy:''' Swindler''

References

External links 
 

Film festivals in Rome
August events
Annual events in Italy
Italian film awards
Tourist attractions in Rome
Film festivals established in 2018